Channappa Daniel Uttangi (28 October 1881, Uttangi 1962, Karnataka) was an Indian author and poet.

Career

Channappa Uttangi began his theological studies at the age of twenty at the Basel Seminary. Upon completing his studies Uttangi joined Basel Mission as an Evangelist in 1908. Uttangi's first published work was from a sermon preached at a Hindu gathering in Benares (today Varanasi). Varanasi is known as a symbolic place for Hindu culture and learning.

Uttangi's was awarded by the Kannada Sahitya Sammelana for his groundbreaking work on the Kannada poet Sarvajna. For 25 years Uttangi researched this 16th-century Kannada poet.

The poems of Sarvajna were spread out among the villages. To study these poems Uttangi developed a skill of reading and interpreting the ancient manuscripts preserved on palm leaves. Uttangi would go to the villages stay with the people and collect information on the poems of Sarvajna. In all Uttangi collected 2000 poems and classified them in a systematic manner.

A statue of Channappa Uttangi was unveiled at his native village in Hadagali taluk by the former Chief Minister, N. Dharam Singh in July 2004.

Works

Books on Christianity

Bethlehem’s Request to Banares (1921)

Narayan Waman Tilak (1927)

The Essence of Sadhu Sundar Singh’s Spiritual Experience: Part I (1939)

The Essence of Sadhu Sundar Singh’s Spiritual Experience: Part II (1953)

Mrityunjaya (An account of the Last Days of Jesus Christ) (1963)

Books on Lingayatism

Vachanas of Sarvajna (1924)

Basaveshwara and the Advancement of Karnataka (1923)

Basaveshwara and the Uplift of Untouchables (1933)

Vachanas of Miligeya Marayaa and Queen Mahadevi (ed with Prof. S. S. Bhusanurmath, 1950)

The Historicity of Anubhava Mantapa (1951)

The collection of Siddharmas's Literary Works (1955)

Vachana of Adayya (1957)

Lingayatism and Christianity (1969)

Anubhava Mantapa: The heart of Virashaivism (1932)

Books on Hinduism

Well-Wisher of the Hindu Society (Eradication of Casteisim and National Integration) (1921)

Yellamma: A Goddess of South India (1995)

A Complete Concordance to the Bhagvad Gita (Unpublished)

See also
Lingayat

References 

 Reverend Channappa Uttangi: Life and Work of an Inter-Faith Pioneer by S. R. Gunjal, Translated from Kannada into English by M. Panchappa, Published by Christian Institute for the Study of Religion and Society, Bangalore. 2007.

 A Channappa Uttangi Reader : Selected Writings of Rev. Daniel Channappa Uttangi (1881–1962) Translated from Kannada. Edited by Arun Kumar Wesley. 2007.

External links
Uttangi Channappa Contextual Christian
Uttangi Statue Unveiled

Kannada poets
Indian Christians
Indian male poets
Evangelists
Kannada people
1881 births
1962 deaths
20th-century Indian poets
Poets from Karnataka
People from Bellary district
20th-century Indian male writers